Simon Stainton (born 9 January 1974 from Mablethorpe, Lincolnshire) is an English professional darts player, who is currently playing in World Darts Federation events.

Career
In September 2019, he qualified for the 2020 BDO World Darts Championship, where he played Darren Herewini in the preliminary round but lost 1–3.

World Championship results

BDO
 2020: Preliminary round (lost to Darren Herewini 1–3)

References

External links
 

Living people
English darts players
1974 births